Theo is an unincorporated community in Alcorn County, Mississippi, United States.

Located in a subtropical environment, the area has a mosaic forest, with notably hot, humid summers.

Services
Theo is a small, rural residential community with few services.

Emergency services are provided by the Union Center Theo Volunteer Fire Department, across the Tippah County line in Walnut, Mississippi.

Theo does not have its own post office as of 2014; it shares ZIP code 38834 with Kossuth and Corinth. However, at some time in the past, it did have its own post office. In the late 19th century it had between 20 and 68 residents. In the 1890s, the area was quite busy, and while there were roads and several post offices in surrounding communities, there was no train station in Theo.

References

External links
 CitiesandVillages.com listing for Theo
 Video on AllTravels.com of scenic U.S. Route 72 in Theo

Unincorporated communities in Alcorn County, Mississippi
Unincorporated communities in Mississippi